Michael Anthony Brooks (August 17, 1958 – August 22, 2016) was an American professional basketball player. He also held French citizenship. At , he played as a forward.

College career
At La Salle University, Brooks racked up 2,628 points and 1,372 rebounds as an Explorer, leading La Salle to the NCAA Tournament in 1978 and 1980 and earning Big 5 MVP honors during those same years. He was named College Player of the Year in 1980. He is currently the 28th leading scorer in the history of the NCAA. He was inducted into the La Salle Hall of Athletes in 1985 and the Big 5 Hall of Fame in 1986.

Professional career

NBA
Brooks was selected by the San Diego Clippers with the 9th overall pick of the 1980 NBA Draft. In the NBA, Brooks played for the Clippers (1980–84), Indiana Pacers (1986–87) and Denver Nuggets (1987–88) in altogether 319 games over six seasons.

France 
He played in France for Limoges CSP from 1988 to 1992, winning the French national championship in 1989 and 1990. He was named Foreign Player MVP of the French league in 1991 and 1992. After leaving Limoges, Brooks had stints with other French teams, Levallois and Strasbourg. His best stats in the French league came in the 1990–91 season, when he averaged 21.4 points and 10.3 rebounds a game for Limoges.

National team career
Brooks played with Team USA at the Pan American Games's 1979 tournament. Brooks was chosen to be the team captain of the USA's 1980 Summer Olympics team, but he was unable to compete, due to the 1980 Summer Olympics boycott. In 2007, he received one of 461 Congressional Gold Medals, created especially for the spurned athletes.

Personal life
Michael Brooks moved to Switzerland in 2005, where he worked as a basketball coach.

He had five children, Michael Johnson-Brooks, Athena Brooks, Julien Brooks, Jasper Brooks, and Sacha Brooks. He died on August 22, 2016, at the age of 58, after suffering a massive stroke. Michael was also survived by his mother and 2 younger sisters.

See also
 List of NCAA Division I men's basketball players with 2000 points and 1000 rebounds

References

External links

1958 births
2016 deaths
African-American basketball players
Albany Patroons players
All-American college men's basketball players
American expatriate basketball people in France
American expatriate basketball people in Switzerland
American men's basketball coaches
American men's basketball players
Basketball players at the 1979 Pan American Games
Basketball players from Philadelphia
Charlotte Hornets expansion draft picks
Congressional Gold Medal recipients
Denver Nuggets players
French men's basketball players
Indiana Pacers players
La Salle Explorers men's basketball players
Levallois Sporting Club Basket players
Limoges CSP players
Medalists at the 1979 Pan American Games
Metropolitans 92 players
Pan American Games gold medalists for the United States
Pan American Games medalists in basketball
San Diego Clippers draft picks
San Diego Clippers players
SIG Basket players
Small forwards
United States Basketball League players
20th-century African-American sportspeople
21st-century African-American people